James Robert Richards (July 19, 1948 – April 24, 2007) was an American veterinarian who was a noted expert on cats. He headed the Feline Health Center of the Cornell University College of Veterinary Medicine from 1997 until his death.

Born in Richmond, Indiana, he grew up in rural Ohio. He earned a math degree from Berea College in 1970 and his veterinary degree from Ohio State University in 1979. He began at Cornell in 1991.

Richards died in Johnson City, New York from injuries sustained in a motorcycle accident where he swerved to avoid hitting a cat.

Selected bibliography

ASPCA Complete Guide to Cats (Chronicle Books, 1999)
The Well-Behaved Cat: How to Change Your Cat’s Bad Habits (Englander Communications, 2001) - editor
The Cornell Book of Cats (Villard, 1997) - editor

See also
 List of unusual deaths

References

External links
Cornell Feline Health Center

1948 births
2007 deaths
Berea College alumni
Cornell University faculty
Motorcycle road incident deaths
Road incident deaths in New York (state)
People from Richmond, Indiana
American veterinarians
Male veterinarians
Ohio State University College of Veterinary Medicine alumni